Redbridge is an area of Ilford in East London, England. It gives its name to the London Borough of Redbridge, a local government district of Greater London, with which it should not be confused.

Etymology
The name comes from a bridge over the River Roding which was demolished in 1921. The bridge was made of red brick, unlike other bridges in the area, which were made of white stone. The name was later applied to the wider London borough created in 1965. The bridge was earlier known as Hocklee's Bridge.

History
Historically, Redbridge formed part of the ancient parish of Barking in Essex. In 1888 it became part of the new civil parish of Ilford. The civil parish became a local board district in 1890, urban district in 1894 and municipal borough in 1926. The Municipal Borough of Ilford was abolished in 1965 and its former area became part of the London Borough of Redbridge in Greater London.

Transport and locale
The nearest London Underground station is Redbridge on the Central line.

Nearest places
 Clayhall
 Gants Hill
 Ilford
 Snaresbrook
 Wanstead

References

Suburbs in the United Kingdom